The 1986 Wisconsin Badgers football team represented the University of Wisconsin–Madison in the 1986 NCAA Division I-A football season.

Schedule

Personnel

Draft picks

References

Wisconsin
Wisconsin Badgers football seasons
Wisconsin Badgers football